Koloa Fineaso Talake (7 June 1934 – 26 May 2008) was a political figure from the Pacific nation of Tuvalu. He represented the constituency of Vaitupu in the Parliament of Tuvalu from 1993. He served as Minister of Finance (1993-1996) and was the prime minister for a short period of time.

Previous to his political career he was the auditor of the Gilbert and Ellice Islands colony (1973-1975), then auditor (1976-1977) and finance secretary (1977-1978) of Tuvalu. 

As a member of parliament he moved the vote of no confidence that forced Prime Minister Bikenibeu Paeniu to resign in 1999.

Prime Minister of Tuvalu
Talake served as the seventh Prime Minister of Tuvalu for nine months, 14 December 2001 – 2 August 2002, after defeating Faimalaga Luka in a vote of no confidence.

Talake was defeated in elections in 2002.

Significant issues during premiership
In that time, he negotiated the sale of that country's Internet domain name, .tv, to an American company in order to bring an income to his resource-poor country.

In 2002, he coordinated an effort, together with the leaders of Kiribati and Maldives to sue the governments of the United States and Australia for failing to ratify the Kyoto Protocol and for their greenhouse gas emissions, which the leaders claimed, resulted in rising sea levels that would eventually flood their countries.

Succession and later life
Talake was not re-elected in the 2002 Tuvaluan general election and was succeeded as Prime Minister of Tuvalu by Saufatu Sopoanga.

Having left office in 2002, Talake relocated to Auckland, New Zealand, where his children were living.

See also
 Politics of Tuvalu

References 

1934 births
2008 deaths
Prime Ministers of Tuvalu
Finance Ministers of Tuvalu
Tuvaluan emigrants to New Zealand